Emilie Grand'Pierre (born 3 May 2001) is a Haitian swimmer. She competed in the women's 100 metre breaststroke at the 2020 Summer Olympics. She attends Bowdoin College.

References

External links
 

2001 births
Living people
Haitian female swimmers
Olympic swimmers of Haiti
Swimmers at the 2020 Summer Olympics
Swimmers from Atlanta
American sportspeople of Haitian descent
American female swimmers
Bowdoin Polar Bears women's swimmers
21st-century American women
21st-century Haitian women